Lepidoptera of Andorra consist of both the butterflies and moths recorded from Andorra.

According to a recent estimate, there are a total of 885 Lepidoptera species present in Andorra.

Butterflies

Hesperiidae
Carcharodus alceae (Esper, 1780)
Carcharodus floccifera (Zeller, 1847)
Erynnis tages (Linnaeus, 1758)
Hesperia comma (Linnaeus, 1758)
Pyrgus alveus (Hübner, 1803)
Pyrgus cacaliae (Rambur, 1839)
Pyrgus cirsii (Rambur, 1839)
Pyrgus malvae (Linnaeus, 1758)
Pyrgus serratulae (Rambur, 1839)
Thymelicus acteon (Rottemburg, 1775)
Thymelicus lineola (Ochsenheimer, 1808)
Thymelicus sylvestris (Poda, 1761)

Lycaenidae
Aricia agestis (Denis & Schiffermuller, 1775)
Aricia cramera Eschscholtz, 1821
Aricia nicias (Meigen, 1830)
Callophrys rubi (Linnaeus, 1758)
Cupido minimus (Fuessly, 1775)
Laeosopis roboris (Esper, 1789)
Lampides boeticus (Linnaeus, 1767)
Leptotes pirithous (Linnaeus, 1767)
Lycaena alciphron (Rottemburg, 1775)
Lycaena hippothoe (Linnaeus, 1761)
Lycaena phlaeas (Linnaeus, 1761)
Lycaena tityrus (Poda, 1761)
Lycaena virgaureae (Linnaeus, 1758)
Lysandra bellargus (Rottemburg, 1775)
Lysandra coridon (Poda, 1761)
Lysandra hispana (Herrich-Schäffer, 1852)
Phengaris arion (Linnaeus, 1758)
Plebejus argus (Linnaeus, 1758)
Plebejus idas (Linnaeus, 1761)
Polyommatus damon (Denis & Schiffermuller, 1775)
Polyommatus daphnis (Denis & Schiffermuller, 1775)
Polyommatus amandus (Schneider, 1792)
Polyommatus dorylas (Denis & Schiffermuller, 1775)
Polyommatus eros (Ochsenheimer, 1808)
Polyommatus escheri (Hübner, 1823)
Polyommatus icarus (Rottemburg, 1775)
Satyrium spini (Denis & Schiffermuller, 1775)

Nymphalidae
Aglais io (Linnaeus, 1758)
Aglais urticae (Linnaeus, 1758)
Arethusana arethusa (Denis & Schiffermuller, 1775)
Argynnis paphia (Linnaeus, 1758)
Argynnis pandora (Denis & Schiffermuller, 1775)
Boloria eunomia (Esper, 1759)
Boloria napaea (Hoffmannsegg, 1804)
Boloria pales (Denis & Schiffermuller, 1775)
Boloria selene (Denis & Schiffermuller, 1775)
Brenthis daphne (Bergstrasser, 1780)
Brenthis ino (Rottemburg, 1775)
Brintesia circe (Fabricius, 1775)
Coenonympha arcania (Linnaeus, 1761)
Coenonympha dorus (Esper, 1782)
Erebia cassioides (Reiner & Hochenwarth, 1792)
Erebia epiphron (Knoch, 1783)
Erebia euryale (Esper, 1805)
Erebia gorgone Boisduval, 1833
Erebia hispania Butler, 1868
Erebia manto (Denis & Schiffermuller, 1775)
Erebia meolans (Prunner, 1798)
Erebia oeme (Hübner, 1804)
Erebia pandrose (Borkhausen, 1788)
Erebia rondoui Oberthur, 1908
Erebia triarius (de Prunner, 1798)
Fabriciana adippe (Denis & Schiffermuller, 1775)
Hipparchia fagi (Scopoli, 1763)
Hipparchia hermione (Linnaeus, 1764)
Hipparchia semele (Linnaeus, 1758)
Issoria lathonia (Linnaeus, 1758)
Lasiommata maera (Linnaeus, 1758)
Lasiommata megera (Linnaeus, 1767)
Limenitis camilla (Linnaeus, 1764)
Limenitis reducta Staudinger, 1901
Maniola jurtina (Linnaeus, 1758)
Melanargia lachesis (Hübner, 1790)
Melitaea athalia (Rottemburg, 1775)
Melitaea cinxia (Linnaeus, 1758)
Melitaea deione (Geyer, 1832)
Melitaea didyma (Esper, 1778)
Melitaea parthenoides Keferstein, 1851
Melitaea phoebe (Denis & Schiffermuller, 1775)
Melitaea trivia (Denis & Schiffermuller, 1775)
Nymphalis antiopa (Linnaeus, 1758)
Polygonia c-album (Linnaeus, 1758)
Pyronia bathseba (Fabricius, 1793)
Pyronia tithonus (Linnaeus, 1767)
Satyrus actaea (Esper, 1781)
Speyeria aglaja (Linnaeus, 1758)
Vanessa atalanta (Linnaeus, 1758)
Vanessa cardui (Linnaeus, 1758)

Papilionidae
Iphiclides podalirius (Linnaeus, 1758)
Papilio machaon Linnaeus, 1758
Parnassius apollo (Linnaeus, 1758)
Parnassius mnemosyne (Linnaeus, 1758)

Pieridae
Anthocharis cardamines (Linnaeus, 1758)
Anthocharis euphenoides Staudinger, 1869
Aporia crataegi (Linnaeus, 1758)
Colias croceus (Fourcroy, 1785)
Colias phicomone (Esper, 1780)
Gonepteryx rhamni (Linnaeus, 1758)
Leptidea sinapis (Linnaeus, 1758)
Pieris brassicae (Linnaeus, 1758)
Pieris mannii (Mayer, 1851)
Pieris napi (Linnaeus, 1758)
Pieris rapae (Linnaeus, 1758)
Pontia callidice (Hübner, 1800)

Moths

Coleophoridae
Coleophora adelogrammella Zeller, 1849
Coleophora graminicolella Heinemann, 1876
Coleophora mayrella (Hübner, 1813)
Coleophora ribasella Baldizzone, 1982
Coleophora trifolii (Curtis, 1832)

Cosmopterigidae
Pancalia leuwenhoekella (Linnaeus, 1761)
Vulcaniella grabowiella (Staudinger, 1859)

Cossidae
Acossus terebra (Denis & Schiffermuller, 1775)
Cossus cossus (Linnaeus, 1758)
Dyspessa ulula (Borkhausen, 1790)
Zeuzera pyrina (Linnaeus, 1761)

Crambidae
Angustalius malacellus (Duponchel, 1836)
Catoptria digitellus (Herrich-Schäffer, 1849)
Catoptria falsella (Denis & Schiffermuller, 1775)
Crambus lathoniellus (Zincken, 1817)

Drepanidae
Achlya flavicornis (Linnaeus, 1758)
Cilix glaucata (Scopoli, 1763)
Cymatophorina diluta (Denis & Schiffermuller, 1775)
Falcaria lacertinaria (Linnaeus, 1758)
Ochropacha duplaris (Linnaeus, 1761)
Polyploca ridens (Fabricius, 1787)
Tethea ocularis (Linnaeus, 1767)
Thyatira batis (Linnaeus, 1758)
Watsonalla uncinula (Borkhausen, 1790)

Elachistidae
Elachista andorraensis Traugott-Olsen, 1988
Haplochrois buvati (Baldizzone, 1985)
Heinemannia festivella (Denis & Schiffermuller, 1775)

Endromidae
Endromis versicolora (Linnaeus, 1758)

Erebidae
Apaidia mesogona (Godart, 1824)
Arctia caja (Linnaeus, 1758)
Arctia villica (Linnaeus, 1758)
Atlantarctia tigrina (Villers, 1789)
Autophila dilucida (Hübner, 1808)
Autophila cataphanes (Hübner, 1813)
Callimorpha dominula (Linnaeus, 1758)
Calliteara pudibunda (Linnaeus, 1758)
Calyptra thalictri (Borkhausen, 1790)
Catephia alchymista (Denis & Schiffermuller, 1775)
Catocala coniuncta (Esper, 1787)
Catocala conversa (Esper, 1783)
Catocala elocata (Esper, 1787)
Catocala fraxini (Linnaeus, 1758)
Catocala nupta (Linnaeus, 1767)
Catocala nymphaea (Esper, 1787)
Catocala nymphagoga (Esper, 1787)
Catocala optata (Godart, 1824)
Catocala promissa (Denis & Schiffermuller, 1775)
Catocala puerpera (Giorna, 1791)
Chelis maculosa (Gerning, 1780)
Coscinia cribraria (Linnaeus, 1758)
Diacrisia sannio (Linnaeus, 1758)
Diaphora mendica (Clerck, 1759)
Dicallomera fascelina (Linnaeus, 1758)
Dysauxes punctata (Fabricius, 1781)
Dysgonia algira (Linnaeus, 1767)
Eilema griseola (Hübner, 1803)
Eilema lurideola (Zincken, 1817)
Eilema lutarella (Linnaeus, 1758)
Eilema palliatella (Scopoli, 1763)
Eilema pseudocomplana (Daniel, 1939)
Eilema pygmaeola (Doubleday, 1847)
Eilema sororcula (Hufnagel, 1766)
Eilema uniola (Rambur, 1866)
Eublemma candidana (Fabricius, 1794)
Eublemma ostrina (Hübner, 1808)
Eublemma parva (Hübner, 1808)
Eublemma polygramma (Duponchel, 1842)
Euclidia mi (Clerck, 1759)
Euclidia glyphica (Linnaeus, 1758)
Euplagia quadripunctaria (Poda, 1761)
Euproctis chrysorrhoea (Linnaeus, 1758)
Herminia tarsipennalis (Treitschke, 1835)
Hypena obesalis Treitschke, 1829
Hypena proboscidalis (Linnaeus, 1758)
Hyphoraia testudinaria (Geoffroy in Fourcroy, 1785)
Laspeyria flexula (Denis & Schiffermuller, 1775)
Leucoma salicis (Linnaeus, 1758)
Lithosia quadra (Linnaeus, 1758)
Lygephila craccae (Denis & Schiffermuller, 1775)
Lygephila pastinum (Treitschke, 1826)
Lymantria dispar (Linnaeus, 1758)
Lymantria monacha (Linnaeus, 1758)
Miltochrista miniata (Forster, 1771)
Minucia lunaris (Denis & Schiffermuller, 1775)
Ocneria rubea (Denis & Schiffermuller, 1775)
Ocnogyna zoraida (Graslin, 1837)
Paidia rica (Freyer, 1858)
Paracolax tristalis (Fabricius, 1794)
Parasemia plantaginis (Linnaeus, 1758)
Phragmatobia fuliginosa (Linnaeus, 1758)
Phragmatobia luctifera (Denis & Schiffermuller, 1775)
Phytometra viridaria (Clerck, 1759)
Rhyparia purpurata (Linnaeus, 1758)
Scoliopteryx libatrix (Linnaeus, 1758)
Setina flavicans (Geyer, 1836)
Setina irrorella (Linnaeus, 1758)
Spilosoma lubricipeda (Linnaeus, 1758)
Spilosoma lutea (Hufnagel, 1766)
Watsonarctia deserta (Bartel, 1902)
Zanclognatha lunalis (Scopoli, 1763)

Gelechiidae
Acompsia antirrhinella Milliere, 1866
Acompsia cinerella (Clerck, 1759)
Acompsia pyrenaella Huemer & Karsholt, 2002
Acompsia schmidtiellus (Heyden, 1848)
Bryotropha senectella (Zeller, 1839)
Bryotropha similis (Stainton, 1854)
Bryotropha terrella (Denis & Schiffermuller, 1775)
Carpatolechia fugitivella (Zeller, 1839)
Caryocolum albifaciella (Heinemann, 1870)
Caryocolum leucomelanella (Zeller, 1839)
Caryocolum mazeli Huemer & Nel, 2005
Dactylotula kinkerella (Snellen, 1876)
Exoteleia dodecella (Linnaeus, 1758)
Gelechia sororculella (Hübner, 1817)
Megacraspedus imparellus (Fischer von Röslerstamm, 1843)
Metzneria lappella (Linnaeus, 1758)
Recurvaria leucatella (Clerck, 1759)
Sattleria pyrenaica (Petry, 1904)
Scrobipalpa acuminatella (Sircom, 1850)
Scrobipalpa artemisiella (Treitschke, 1833)
Teleiopsis diffinis (Haworth, 1828)

Geometridae
Acasis viretata (Hübner, 1799)
Adactylotis gesticularia (Hübner, 1817)
Adalbertia castiliaria (Staudinger, 1900)
Aethalura punctulata (Denis & Schiffermuller, 1775)
Agriopis aurantiaria (Hübner, 1799)
Agriopis bajaria (Denis & Schiffermuller, 1775)
Agriopis leucophaearia (Denis & Schiffermuller, 1775)
Agriopis marginaria (Fabricius, 1776)
Alcis repandata (Linnaeus, 1758)
Aleucis distinctata (Herrich-Schäffer, 1839)
Alsophila aescularia (Denis & Schiffermuller, 1775)
Anticlea derivata (Denis & Schiffermuller, 1775)
Aplocera efformata (Guenee, 1858)
Aplocera plagiata (Linnaeus, 1758)
Aplocera praeformata (Hübner, 1826)
Apocheima hispidaria (Denis & Schiffermuller, 1775)
Aspitates gilvaria (Denis & Schiffermuller, 1775)
Asthena albulata (Hufnagel, 1767)
Biston betularia (Linnaeus, 1758)
Biston strataria (Hufnagel, 1767)
Bupalus piniaria (Linnaeus, 1758)
Cabera exanthemata (Scopoli, 1763)
Cabera pusaria (Linnaeus, 1758)
Calamodes occitanaria (Duponchel, 1829)
Campaea margaritaria (Linnaeus, 1761)
Camptogramma bilineata (Linnaeus, 1758)
Cataclysme uniformata (Bellier, 1862)
Catarhoe cuculata (Hufnagel, 1767)
Catarhoe rubidata (Denis & Schiffermuller, 1775)
Charissa obscurata (Denis & Schiffermuller, 1775)
Charissa crenulata (Staudinger, 1871)
Charissa mucidaria (Hübner, 1799)
Charissa ambiguata (Duponchel, 1830)
Charissa glaucinaria (Hübner, 1799)
Chemerina caliginearia (Rambur, 1833)
Chesias legatella (Denis & Schiffermuller, 1775)
Chesias rufata (Fabricius, 1775)
Chiasmia clathrata (Linnaeus, 1758)
Chlorissa cloraria (Hübner, 1813)
Chlorissa viridata (Linnaeus, 1758)
Chloroclysta miata (Linnaeus, 1758)
Chloroclysta siterata (Hufnagel, 1767)
Chloroclystis v-ata (Haworth, 1809)
Cidaria fulvata (Forster, 1771)
Cleora cinctaria (Denis & Schiffermuller, 1775)
Coenotephria tophaceata (Denis & Schiffermuller, 1775)
Colostygia aptata (Hübner, 1813)
Colostygia multistrigaria (Haworth, 1809)
Colostygia olivata (Denis & Schiffermuller, 1775)
Colostygia pectinataria (Knoch, 1781)
Colostygia turbata (Hübner, 1799)
Colotois pennaria (Linnaeus, 1761)
Comibaena bajularia (Denis & Schiffermuller, 1775)
Compsoptera opacaria (Hübner, 1819)
Cosmorhoe ocellata (Linnaeus, 1758)
Crocallis elinguaria (Linnaeus, 1758)
Crocallis tusciaria (Borkhausen, 1793)
Crocota peletieraria (Duponchel, 1830)
Cyclophora hyponoea (Prout, 1935)
Cyclophora suppunctaria (Zeller, 1847)
Cyclophora albiocellaria (Hübner, 1789)
Cyclophora albipunctata (Hufnagel, 1767)
Cyclophora puppillaria (Hübner, 1799)
Cyclophora quercimontaria (Bastelberger, 1897)
Dyscia lentiscaria (Donzel, 1837)
Dysstroma citrata (Linnaeus, 1761)
Dysstroma truncata (Hufnagel, 1767)
Earophila badiata (Denis & Schiffermuller, 1775)
Ecleora solieraria (Rambur, 1834)
Ecliptopera silaceata (Denis & Schiffermuller, 1775)
Electrophaes corylata (Thunberg, 1792)
Elophos dognini (Thierry-Mieg, 1910)
Ematurga atomaria (Linnaeus, 1758)
Ennomos alniaria (Linnaeus, 1758)
Ennomos fuscantaria (Haworth, 1809)
Ennomos quercaria (Hübner, 1813)
Entephria caeruleata (Guenee, 1858)
Entephria flavicinctata (Hübner, 1813)
Epione repandaria (Hufnagel, 1767)
Epione vespertaria (Linnaeus, 1767)
Epirrhoe alternata (Muller, 1764)
Epirrhoe galiata (Denis & Schiffermuller, 1775)
Epirrhoe molluginata (Hübner, 1813)
Epirrhoe rivata (Hübner, 1813)
Epirrhoe tristata (Linnaeus, 1758)
Epirrita autumnata (Borkhausen, 1794)
Epirrita christyi (Allen, 1906)
Epirrita dilutata (Denis & Schiffermuller, 1775)
Erannis defoliaria (Clerck, 1759)
Eulithis populata (Linnaeus, 1758)
Eulithis prunata (Linnaeus, 1758)
Euphyia biangulata (Haworth, 1809)
Euphyia frustata (Treitschke, 1828)
Eupithecia abbreviata Stephens, 1831
Eupithecia absinthiata (Clerck, 1759)
Eupithecia alliaria Staudinger, 1870
Eupithecia carpophagata Staudinger, 1871
Eupithecia centaureata (Denis & Schiffermuller, 1775)
Eupithecia cocciferata Milliere, 1864
Eupithecia denotata (Hübner, 1813)
Eupithecia distinctaria Herrich-Schäffer, 1848
Eupithecia dodoneata Guenee, 1858
Eupithecia extraversaria Herrich-Schäffer, 1852
Eupithecia haworthiata Doubleday, 1856
Eupithecia icterata (de Villers, 1789)
Eupithecia impurata (Hübner, 1813)
Eupithecia indigata (Hübner, 1813)
Eupithecia innotata (Hufnagel, 1767)
Eupithecia intricata (Zetterstedt, 1839)
Eupithecia irriguata (Hübner, 1813)
Eupithecia linariata (Denis & Schiffermuller, 1775)
Eupithecia massiliata Milliere, 1865
Eupithecia nanata (Hübner, 1813)
Eupithecia orphnata W. Petersen, 1909
Eupithecia oxycedrata (Rambur, 1833)
Eupithecia pauxillaria Boisduval, 1840
Eupithecia pimpinellata (Hübner, 1813)
Eupithecia plumbeolata (Haworth, 1809)
Eupithecia pulchellata Stephens, 1831
Eupithecia pusillata (Denis & Schiffermuller, 1775)
Eupithecia pyreneata Mabille, 1871
Eupithecia satyrata (Hübner, 1813)
Eupithecia semigraphata Bruand, 1850
Eupithecia silenata Assmann, 1848
Eupithecia subfuscata (Haworth, 1809)
Eupithecia subumbrata (Denis & Schiffermuller, 1775)
Eupithecia tantillaria Boisduval, 1840
Eupithecia tripunctaria Herrich-Schäffer, 1852
Eupithecia venosata (Fabricius, 1787)
Eupithecia veratraria Herrich-Schäffer, 1848
Eupithecia vulgata (Haworth, 1809)
Gandaritis pyraliata (Denis & Schiffermuller, 1775)
Geometra papilionaria (Linnaeus, 1758)
Glacies bentelii (Ratzer, 1890)
Gnophos obfuscata (Denis & Schiffermuller, 1775)
Gymnoscelis rufifasciata (Haworth, 1809)
Hemistola chrysoprasaria (Esper, 1795)
Horisme aemulata (Hübner, 1813)
Horisme radicaria (de La Harpe, 1855)
Horisme tersata (Denis & Schiffermuller, 1775)
Horisme vitalbata (Denis & Schiffermuller, 1775)
Hydriomena furcata (Thunberg, 1784)
Hydriomena ruberata (Freyer, 1831)
Hylaea fasciaria (Linnaeus, 1758)
Idaea alyssumata (Milliere, 1871)
Idaea aversata (Linnaeus, 1758)
Idaea calunetaria (Staudinger, 1859)
Idaea cervantaria (Milliere, 1869)
Idaea contiguaria (Hübner, 1799)
Idaea degeneraria (Hübner, 1799)
Idaea deversaria (Herrich-Schäffer, 1847)
Idaea dilutaria (Hübner, 1799)
Idaea eugeniata (Dardoin & Milliere, 1870)
Idaea fuscovenosa (Goeze, 1781)
Idaea humiliata (Hufnagel, 1767)
Idaea incalcarata (Chretien, 1913)
Idaea luteolaria (Constant, 1863)
Idaea mediaria (Hübner, 1819)
Idaea moniliata (Denis & Schiffermuller, 1775)
Idaea obsoletaria (Rambur, 1833)
Idaea ochrata (Scopoli, 1763)
Idaea ostrinaria (Hübner, 1813)
Idaea rubraria (Staudinger, 1901)
Idaea rufaria (Hübner, 1799)
Idaea rusticata (Denis & Schiffermuller, 1775)
Idaea squalidaria (Staudinger, 1882)
Idaea straminata (Borkhausen, 1794)
Idaea subsaturata (Guenee, 1858)
Idaea subsericeata (Haworth, 1809)
Isturgia limbaria (Fabricius, 1775)
Isturgia miniosaria (Duponchel, 1829)
Isturgia murinaria (Denis & Schiffermuller, 1775)
Jodis lactearia (Linnaeus, 1758)
Lampropteryx suffumata (Denis & Schiffermuller, 1775)
Ligdia adustata (Denis & Schiffermuller, 1775)
Lobophora halterata (Hufnagel, 1767)
Lomaspilis marginata (Linnaeus, 1758)
Lycia hirtaria (Clerck, 1759)
Lythria cruentaria (Hufnagel, 1767)
Macaria brunneata (Thunberg, 1784)
Macaria liturata (Clerck, 1759)
Menophra abruptaria (Thunberg, 1792)
Menophra nycthemeraria (Geyer, 1831)
Mesotype didymata (Linnaeus, 1758)
Mesotype verberata (Scopoli, 1763)
Minoa murinata (Scopoli, 1763)
Nebula achromaria (de La Harpe, 1853)
Nebula nebulata (Treitschke, 1828)
Nychiodes andalusiaria Staudinger, 1892
Nycterosea obstipata (Fabricius, 1794)
Odezia atrata (Linnaeus, 1758)
Odontopera bidentata (Clerck, 1759)
Onychora agaritharia (Dardoin, 1842)
Operophtera brumata (Linnaeus, 1758)
Operophtera fagata (Scharfenberg, 1805)
Opisthograptis luteolata (Linnaeus, 1758)
Ourapteryx sambucaria (Linnaeus, 1758)
Pasiphila rectangulata (Linnaeus, 1758)
Pennithera firmata (Hübner, 1822)
Peribatodes abstersaria (Boisduval, 1840)
Peribatodes ilicaria (Geyer, 1833)
Peribatodes perversaria (Boisduval, 1840)
Peribatodes powelli (Oberthur, 1913)
Peribatodes rhomboidaria (Denis & Schiffermuller, 1775)
Peribatodes subflavaria (Milliere, 1876)
Perizoma albulata (Denis & Schiffermuller, 1775)
Perizoma alchemillata (Linnaeus, 1758)
Perizoma bifaciata (Haworth, 1809)
Perizoma blandiata (Denis & Schiffermuller, 1775)
Perizoma flavosparsata (Wagner, 1926)
Perizoma hydrata (Treitschke, 1829)
Perizoma lugdunaria (Herrich-Schäffer, 1855)
Perizoma obsoletata (Herrich-Schäffer, 1838)
Petrophora narbonea (Linnaeus, 1767)
Phigalia pilosaria (Denis & Schiffermuller, 1775)
Philereme vetulata (Denis & Schiffermuller, 1775)
Plagodis pulveraria (Linnaeus, 1758)
Problepsis ocellata (Frivaldszky, 1845)
Pseudopanthera macularia (Linnaeus, 1758)
Pseudoterpna coronillaria (Hübner, 1817)
Psodos quadrifaria (Sulzer, 1776)
Pungeleria capreolaria (Denis & Schiffermuller, 1775)
Rheumaptera hastata (Linnaeus, 1758)
Rhodometra sacraria (Linnaeus, 1767)
Rhodostrophia calabra (Petagna, 1786)
Rhodostrophia vibicaria (Clerck, 1759)
Rhoptria asperaria (Hübner, 1817)
Sciadia tenebraria (Esper, 1806)
Scopula asellaria (Herrich-Schäffer, 1847)
Scopula floslactata (Haworth, 1809)
Scopula imitaria (Hübner, 1799)
Scopula incanata (Linnaeus, 1758)
Scopula marginepunctata (Goeze, 1781)
Scopula rufomixtaria (de Graslin, 1863)
Scopula immorata (Linnaeus, 1758)
Scopula ornata (Scopoli, 1763)
Scopula submutata (Treitschke, 1828)
Scotopteryx angularia (de Villers, 1789)
Scotopteryx bipunctaria (Denis & Schiffermuller, 1775)
Scotopteryx chenopodiata (Linnaeus, 1758)
Scotopteryx coelinaria (de Graslin, 1863)
Scotopteryx luridata (Hufnagel, 1767)
Scotopteryx moeniata (Scopoli, 1763)
Scotopteryx mucronata (Scopoli, 1763)
Scotopteryx octodurensis (Favre, 1903)
Scotopteryx peribolata (Hübner, 1817)
Selenia dentaria (Fabricius, 1775)
Selenia lunularia (Hübner, 1788)
Selidosema brunnearia (de Villers, 1789)
Selidosema taeniolaria (Hübner, 1813)
Siona lineata (Scopoli, 1763)
Spargania luctuata (Denis & Schiffermuller, 1775)
Stegania trimaculata (de Villers, 1789)
Tephronia oranaria Staudinger, 1892
Tephronia sepiaria (Hufnagel, 1767)
Thalera fimbrialis (Scopoli, 1763)
Thera britannica (Turner, 1925)
Thera cognata (Thunberg, 1792)
Thera obeliscata (Hübner, 1787)
Thera variata (Denis & Schiffermuller, 1775)
Theria primaria (Haworth, 1809)
Thetidia smaragdaria (Fabricius, 1787)
Timandra comae Schmidt, 1931
Trichopteryx carpinata (Borkhausen, 1794)
Triphosa dubitata (Linnaeus, 1758)
Triphosa sabaudiata (Duponchel, 1830)
Xanthorhoe designata (Hufnagel, 1767)
Xanthorhoe fluctuata (Linnaeus, 1758)
Xanthorhoe montanata (Denis & Schiffermuller, 1775)
Xanthorhoe spadicearia (Denis & Schiffermuller, 1775)

Hepialidae
Pharmacis fusconebulosa (DeGeer, 1778)
Pharmacis pyrenaicus (Donzel, 1838)
Triodia sylvina (Linnaeus, 1761)

Heterogynidae
Heterogynis penella (Hübner, 1819)

Lasiocampidae
Dendrolimus pini (Linnaeus, 1758)
Gastropacha quercifolia (Linnaeus, 1758)
Gastropacha populifolia (Denis & Schiffermuller, 1775)
Lasiocampa quercus (Linnaeus, 1758)
Lasiocampa trifolii (Denis & Schiffermuller, 1775)
Macrothylacia rubi (Linnaeus, 1758)
Malacosoma castrensis (Linnaeus, 1758)
Malacosoma neustria (Linnaeus, 1758)
Poecilocampa populi (Linnaeus, 1758)
Trichiura crataegi (Linnaeus, 1758)

Momphidae
Mompha miscella (Denis & Schiffermuller, 1775)

Nepticulidae
Stigmella ilicifoliella (Mendes, 1918)

Noctuidae
Abrostola asclepiadis (Denis & Schiffermuller, 1775)
Abrostola triplasia (Linnaeus, 1758)
Acontia lucida (Hufnagel, 1766)
Acronicta leporina (Linnaeus, 1758)
Acronicta alni (Linnaeus, 1767)
Acronicta psi (Linnaeus, 1758)
Acronicta auricoma (Denis & Schiffermuller, 1775)
Acronicta euphorbiae (Denis & Schiffermuller, 1775)
Acronicta rumicis (Linnaeus, 1758)
Actinotia polyodon (Clerck, 1759)
Actinotia radiosa (Esper, 1804)
Agrochola lychnidis (Denis & Schiffermuller, 1775)
Agrochola helvola (Linnaeus, 1758)
Agrochola litura (Linnaeus, 1758)
Agrochola lunosa (Haworth, 1809)
Agrochola lota (Clerck, 1759)
Agrochola macilenta (Hübner, 1809)
Agrochola circellaris (Hufnagel, 1766)
Agrotis bigramma (Esper, 1790)
Agrotis cinerea (Denis & Schiffermuller, 1775)
Agrotis clavis (Hufnagel, 1766)
Agrotis exclamationis (Linnaeus, 1758)
Agrotis ipsilon (Hufnagel, 1766)
Agrotis puta (Hübner, 1803)
Agrotis segetum (Denis & Schiffermuller, 1775)
Agrotis simplonia (Geyer, 1832)
Agrotis trux (Hübner, 1824)
Allophyes alfaroi Agenjo, 1951
Ammoconia caecimacula (Denis & Schiffermuller, 1775)
Ammopolia witzenmanni (Standfuss, 1890)
Amphipoea oculea (Linnaeus, 1761)
Amphipyra berbera Rungs, 1949
Amphipyra effusa Boisduval, 1828
Amphipyra pyramidea (Linnaeus, 1758)
Amphipyra tragopoginis (Clerck, 1759)
Amphipyra cinnamomea (Goeze, 1781)
Anaplectoides prasina (Denis & Schiffermuller, 1775)
Anarta myrtilli (Linnaeus, 1761)
Anarta odontites (Boisduval, 1829)
Anarta pugnax (Hübner, 1824)
Anarta trifolii (Hufnagel, 1766)
Anorthoa munda (Denis & Schiffermuller, 1775)
Antitype chi (Linnaeus, 1758)
Apamea crenata (Hufnagel, 1766)
Apamea furva (Denis & Schiffermuller, 1775)
Apamea lateritia (Hufnagel, 1766)
Apamea lithoxylaea (Denis & Schiffermuller, 1775)
Apamea maillardi (Geyer, 1834)
Apamea monoglypha (Hufnagel, 1766)
Apamea platinea (Treitschke, 1825)
Apamea sordens (Hufnagel, 1766)
Apamea sublustris (Esper, 1788)
Aporophyla nigra (Haworth, 1809)
Apterogenum ypsillon (Denis & Schiffermuller, 1775)
Atethmia centrago (Haworth, 1809)
Athetis pallustris (Hübner, 1808)
Autographa bractea (Denis & Schiffermuller, 1775)
Autographa gamma (Linnaeus, 1758)
Autographa jota (Linnaeus, 1758)
Autographa pulchrina (Haworth, 1809)
Axylia putris (Linnaeus, 1761)
Brachylomia viminalis (Fabricius, 1776)
Bryonycta pineti (Staudinger, 1859)
Bryophila raptricula (Denis & Schiffermuller, 1775)
Bryophila ravula (Hübner, 1813)
Bryophila domestica (Hufnagel, 1766)
Bryophila microglossa (Rambur, 1858)
Callopistria latreillei (Duponchel, 1827)
Calophasia lunula (Hufnagel, 1766)
Calophasia platyptera (Esper, 1788)
Caradrina clavipalpis Scopoli, 1763
Caradrina flavirena Guenee, 1852
Caradrina selini Boisduval, 1840
Caradrina aspersa Rambur, 1834
Ceramica pisi (Linnaeus, 1758)
Cerapteryx graminis (Linnaeus, 1758)
Cerastis rubricosa (Denis & Schiffermuller, 1775)
Charanyca ferruginea (Esper, 1785)
Chersotis alpestris (Boisduval, 1837)
Chersotis cuprea (Denis & Schiffermuller, 1775)
Chersotis margaritacea (Villers, 1789)
Chersotis multangula (Hübner, 1803)
Chersotis ocellina (Denis & Schiffermuller, 1775)
Chloantha hyperici (Denis & Schiffermuller, 1775)
Cleonymia yvanii (Duponchel, 1833)
Colocasia coryli (Linnaeus, 1758)
Conisania luteago (Denis & Schiffermuller, 1775)
Conistra daubei (Duponchel, 1838)
Conistra gallica (Lederer, 1857)
Conistra rubiginosa (Scopoli, 1763)
Conistra vaccinii (Linnaeus, 1761)
Conistra erythrocephala (Denis & Schiffermuller, 1775)
Conistra rubiginea (Denis & Schiffermuller, 1775)
Conistra staudingeri (Graslin, 1863)
Conistra torrida (Lederer, 1857)
Cosmia trapezina (Linnaeus, 1758)
Cosmia affinis (Linnaeus, 1767)
Craniophora pontica (Staudinger, 1878)
Cryphia algae (Fabricius, 1775)
Cucullia absinthii (Linnaeus, 1761)
Cucullia campanulae Freyer, 1831
Cucullia lucifuga (Denis & Schiffermuller, 1775)
Cucullia umbratica (Linnaeus, 1758)
Cucullia xeranthemi Boisduval, 1840
Cucullia scrophulariae (Denis & Schiffermuller, 1775)
Cucullia verbasci (Linnaeus, 1758)
Dasypolia templi (Thunberg, 1792)
Diachrysia chrysitis (Linnaeus, 1758)
Diarsia guadarramensis (Boursin, 1928)
Dichagyris flammatra (Denis & Schiffermuller, 1775)
Dichagyris musiva (Hübner, 1803)
Dichagyris candelisequa (Denis & Schiffermuller, 1775)
Dichagyris constanti (Milliere, 1860)
Dichagyris forcipula (Denis & Schiffermuller, 1775)
Dichagyris nigrescens (Hofner, 1888)
Dichagyris renigera (Hübner, 1808)
Dicycla oo (Linnaeus, 1758)
Diloba caeruleocephala (Linnaeus, 1758)
Dryobota labecula (Esper, 1788)
Dryobotodes tenebrosa (Esper, 1789)
Dryobotodes eremita (Fabricius, 1775)
Dryobotodes monochroma (Esper, 1790)
Dryobotodes roboris (Geyer, 1835)
Dypterygia scabriuscula (Linnaeus, 1758)
Egira conspicillaris (Linnaeus, 1758)
Enargia paleacea (Esper, 1788)
Epilecta linogrisea (Denis & Schiffermuller, 1775)
Epipsilia grisescens (Fabricius, 1794)
Eremobia ochroleuca (Denis & Schiffermuller, 1775)
Eremohadena halimi (Milliere, 1877)
Euchalcia variabilis (Piller, 1783)
Eugnorisma glareosa (Esper, 1788)
Eugnorisma depuncta (Linnaeus, 1761)
Eupsilia transversa (Hufnagel, 1766)
Eurois occulta (Linnaeus, 1758)
Euxoa aquilina (Denis & Schiffermuller, 1775)
Euxoa conspicua (Hübner, 1824)
Euxoa decora (Denis & Schiffermuller, 1775)
Euxoa nigricans (Linnaeus, 1761)
Euxoa obelisca (Denis & Schiffermuller, 1775)
Euxoa recussa (Hübner, 1817)
Euxoa temera (Hübner, 1808)
Euxoa tritici (Linnaeus, 1761)
Griposia aprilina (Linnaeus, 1758)
Hada plebeja (Linnaeus, 1761)
Hadena perplexa (Denis & Schiffermuller, 1775)
Hadena ruetimeyeri Boursin, 1951
Hadena albimacula (Borkhausen, 1792)
Hadena bicruris (Hufnagel, 1766)
Hadena caesia (Denis & Schiffermuller, 1775)
Hadena compta (Denis & Schiffermuller, 1775)
Hadena confusa (Hufnagel, 1766)
Hadena filograna (Esper, 1788)
Hadena magnolii (Boisduval, 1829)
Hecatera bicolorata (Hufnagel, 1766)
Hecatera dysodea (Denis & Schiffermuller, 1775)
Helicoverpa armigera (Hübner, 1808)
Heliothis peltigera (Denis & Schiffermuller, 1775)
Heliothis viriplaca (Hufnagel, 1766)
Hoplodrina ambigua (Denis & Schiffermuller, 1775)
Hoplodrina blanda (Denis & Schiffermuller, 1775)
Hoplodrina octogenaria (Goeze, 1781)
Hoplodrina respersa (Denis & Schiffermuller, 1775)
Hoplodrina superstes (Ochsenheimer, 1816)
Ipimorpha subtusa (Denis & Schiffermuller, 1775)
Jodia croceago (Denis & Schiffermuller, 1775)
Lacanobia thalassina (Hufnagel, 1766)
Lacanobia oleracea (Linnaeus, 1758)
Lacanobia w-latinum (Hufnagel, 1766)
Lasionycta imbecilla (Fabricius, 1794)
Lasionycta proxima (Hübner, 1809)
Lateroligia ophiogramma (Esper, 1794)
Leucania loreyi (Duponchel, 1827)
Leucania comma (Linnaeus, 1761)
Leucochlaena oditis (Hübner, 1822)
Lithophane furcifera (Hufnagel, 1766)
Lithophane ornitopus (Hufnagel, 1766)
Lithophane semibrunnea (Haworth, 1809)
Lithophane leautieri (Boisduval, 1829)
Litoligia literosa (Haworth, 1809)
Lophoterges millierei (Staudinger, 1871)
Luperina nickerlii (Freyer, 1845)
Luperina testacea (Denis & Schiffermuller, 1775)
Lycophotia porphyrea (Denis & Schiffermuller, 1775)
Mamestra brassicae (Linnaeus, 1758)
Melanchra persicariae (Linnaeus, 1761)
Mesapamea secalella Remm, 1983
Mesapamea secalis (Linnaeus, 1758)
Mesogona acetosellae (Denis & Schiffermuller, 1775)
Mesoligia furuncula (Denis & Schiffermuller, 1775)
Mniotype adusta (Esper, 1790)
Mormo maura (Linnaeus, 1758)
Mythimna albipuncta (Denis & Schiffermuller, 1775)
Mythimna ferrago (Fabricius, 1787)
Mythimna l-album (Linnaeus, 1767)
Mythimna conigera (Denis & Schiffermuller, 1775)
Mythimna impura (Hübner, 1808)
Mythimna vitellina (Hübner, 1808)
Mythimna unipuncta (Haworth, 1809)
Mythimna sicula (Treitschke, 1835)
Noctua comes Hübner, 1813
Noctua fimbriata (Schreber, 1759)
Noctua interjecta Hübner, 1803
Noctua interposita (Hübner, 1790)
Noctua janthina Denis & Schiffermuller, 1775
Noctua pronuba (Linnaeus, 1758)
Noctua tirrenica Biebinger, Speidel & Hanigk, 1983
Nyctobrya muralis (Forster, 1771)
Ochropleura leucogaster (Freyer, 1831)
Ochropleura plecta (Linnaeus, 1761)
Oligia fasciuncula (Haworth, 1809)
Oligia latruncula (Denis & Schiffermuller, 1775)
Oligia strigilis (Linnaeus, 1758)
Olivenebula xanthochloris (Boisduval, 1840)
Omia cymbalariae (Hübner, 1809)
Orthosia gracilis (Denis & Schiffermuller, 1775)
Orthosia cerasi (Fabricius, 1775)
Orthosia cruda (Denis & Schiffermuller, 1775)
Orthosia populeti (Fabricius, 1775)
Orthosia incerta (Hufnagel, 1766)
Orthosia gothica (Linnaeus, 1758)
Pachetra sagittigera (Hufnagel, 1766)
Panchrysia v-argenteum (Esper, 1798)
Panemeria tenebrata (Scopoli, 1763)
Panolis flammea (Denis & Schiffermuller, 1775)
Papestra biren (Goeze, 1781)
Parastichtis suspecta (Hübner, 1817)
Peridroma saucia (Hübner, 1808)
Phlogophora meticulosa (Linnaeus, 1758)
Polia hepatica (Clerck, 1759)
Polia nebulosa (Hufnagel, 1766)
Polychrysia moneta (Fabricius, 1787)
Polymixis argillaceago (Hübner, 1822)
Polymixis dubia (Duponchel, 1836)
Polymixis xanthomista (Hübner, 1819)
Protolampra sobrina (Duponchel, 1843)
Rhizedra lutosa (Hübner, 1803)
Rhyacia helvetina (Boisduval, 1833)
Rhyacia lucipeta (Denis & Schiffermuller, 1775)
Sideridis rivularis (Fabricius, 1775)
Sideridis reticulata (Goeze, 1781)
Spaelotis ravida (Denis & Schiffermuller, 1775)
Spaelotis senna (Freyer, 1829)
Spodoptera exigua (Hübner, 1808)
Stilbia anomala (Haworth, 1812)
Subacronicta megacephala (Denis & Schiffermuller, 1775)
Syngrapha interrogationis (Linnaeus, 1758)
Thalpophila vitalba (Freyer, 1834)
Tholera decimalis (Poda, 1761)
Trigonophora haasi (Staudinger, 1892)
Trigonophora flammea (Esper, 1785)
Trigonophora jodea (Herrich-Schäffer, 1850)
Tyta luctuosa (Denis & Schiffermuller, 1775)
Valeria jaspidea (Villers, 1789)
Xanthia gilvago (Denis & Schiffermuller, 1775)
Xanthia icteritia (Hufnagel, 1766)
Xanthia ocellaris (Borkhausen, 1792)
Xanthia ruticilla (Esper, 1791)
Xanthia togata (Esper, 1788)
Xestia ashworthii (Doubleday, 1855)
Xestia c-nigrum (Linnaeus, 1758)
Xestia triangulum (Hufnagel, 1766)
Xestia agathina (Duponchel, 1827)
Xestia baja (Denis & Schiffermuller, 1775)
Xestia castanea (Esper, 1798)
Xestia xanthographa (Denis & Schiffermuller, 1775)
Xylena exsoleta (Linnaeus, 1758)
Xylocampa areola (Esper, 1789)

Nolidae
Bena bicolorana (Fuessly, 1775)
Meganola strigula (Denis & Schiffermuller, 1775)
Nola cicatricalis (Treitschke, 1835)
Nola cucullatella (Linnaeus, 1758)
Nola subchlamydula Staudinger, 1871
Pseudoips prasinana (Linnaeus, 1758)

Notodontidae
Cerura iberica (Templado & Ortiz, 1966)
Clostera anachoreta (Denis & Schiffermuller, 1775)
Clostera pigra (Hufnagel, 1766)
Drymonia querna (Denis & Schiffermuller, 1775)
Furcula bifida (Brahm, 1787)
Harpyia milhauseri (Fabricius, 1775)
Notodonta dromedarius (Linnaeus, 1767)
Notodonta tritophus (Denis & Schiffermuller, 1775)
Notodonta ziczac (Linnaeus, 1758)
Peridea anceps (Goeze, 1781)
Phalera bucephala (Linnaeus, 1758)
Pheosia gnoma (Fabricius, 1776)
Pheosia tremula (Clerck, 1759)
Pterostoma palpina (Clerck, 1759)
Ptilodon capucina (Linnaeus, 1758)
Rhegmatophila alpina (Bellier, 1881)
Stauropus fagi (Linnaeus, 1758)
Thaumetopoea pityocampa (Denis & Schiffermuller, 1775)

Psychidae
Penestoglossa pyrenaella Herrmann, 2006
Pseudobankesia casaella Hattenschwiler, 1994

Pterophoridae
Marasmarcha oxydactylus (Staudinger, 1859)
Merrifieldia leucodactyla (Denis & Schiffermuller, 1775)
Stenoptilia pelidnodactyla (Stein, 1837)
Stenoptilia pterodactyla (Linnaeus, 1761)
Stenoptilia zophodactylus (Duponchel, 1840)

Saturniidae
Actias isabellae (Graells, 1849)
Saturnia pavonia (Linnaeus, 1758)
Saturnia pyri (Denis & Schiffermuller, 1775)

Scythrididae
Enolmis acanthella (Godart, 1824)
Scythris obscurella (Scopoli, 1763)
Scythris picaepennis (Haworth, 1828)
Scythris subseliniella (Heinemann, 1876)

Sesiidae
Chamaesphecia bibioniformis (Esper, 1800)
Pyropteron chrysidiformis (Esper, 1782)
Sesia apiformis (Clerck, 1759)

Sphingidae
Acherontia atropos (Linnaeus, 1758)
Agrius convolvuli (Linnaeus, 1758)
Deilephila elpenor (Linnaeus, 1758)
Deilephila porcellus (Linnaeus, 1758)
Hemaris tityus (Linnaeus, 1758)
Hippotion celerio (Linnaeus, 1758)
Hyles euphorbiae (Linnaeus, 1758)
Hyles livornica (Esper, 1780)
Laothoe populi (Linnaeus, 1758)
Macroglossum stellatarum (Linnaeus, 1758)
Mimas tiliae (Linnaeus, 1758)
Proserpinus proserpina (Pallas, 1772)
Smerinthus ocellata (Linnaeus, 1758)
Sphinx ligustri Linnaeus, 1758
Sphinx maurorum (Jordan, 1931)
Sphinx pinastri Linnaeus, 1758

Thyrididae
Thyris fenestrella (Scopoli, 1763)

Tineidae
Ateliotum petrinella (Herrich-Schäffer, 1854)
Eudarcia gallica (Petersen, 1962)
Infurcitinea atrifasciella (Staudinger, 1871)
Infurcitinea roesslerella (Heyden, 1865)
Monopis obviella (Denis & Schiffermuller, 1775)
Myrmecozela ochraceella (Tengstrom, 1848)
Niditinea fuscella (Linnaeus, 1758)

Tortricidae
Aethes cnicana (Westwood, 1854)
Aethes margaritana (Haworth, 1811)
Aethes tesserana (Denis & Schiffermuller, 1775)
Clavigesta sylvestrana (Curtis, 1850)
Cnephasia stephensiana (Doubleday, 1849)
Cochylis atricapitana (Stephens, 1852)
Cochylis hybridella (Hübner, 1813)
Dichrorampha harpeana Frey, 1870
Eana argentana (Clerck, 1759)
Endothenia gentianaeana (Hübner, 1799)
Epinotia ramella (Linnaeus, 1758)
Eucosma pupillana (Clerck, 1759)
Eulia ministrana (Linnaeus, 1758)
Eupoecilia angustana (Hübner, 1799)
Grapholita molesta (Busck, 1916)
Hedya pruniana (Hübner, 1799)
Metendothenia atropunctana (Zetterstedt, 1839)
Notocelia cynosbatella (Linnaeus, 1758)
Notocelia roborana (Denis & Schiffermuller, 1775)
Pammene aurana (Fabricius, 1775)
Phtheochroa frigidana (Guenee, 1845)
Rhopobota naevana (Hübner, 1817)
Tortrix viridana Linnaeus, 1758

Zygaenidae
Adscita geryon (Hübner, 1813)
Adscita statices (Linnaeus, 1758)
Aglaope infausta (Linnaeus, 1767)
Jordanita globulariae (Hübner, 1793)
Zygaena carniolica (Scopoli, 1763)
Zygaena fausta (Linnaeus, 1767)
Zygaena hilaris Ochsenheimer, 1808
Zygaena purpuralis (Brunnich, 1763)
Zygaena sarpedon (Hübner, 1790)
Zygaena anthyllidis Boisduval, 1828
Zygaena exulans (Hohenwarth, 1792)
Zygaena filipendulae (Linnaeus, 1758)
Zygaena lonicerae (Scheven, 1777)
Zygaena loti (Denis & Schiffermuller, 1775)
Zygaena nevadensis Rambur, 1858
Zygaena osterodensis Reiss, 1921
Zygaena transalpina (Esper, 1780)

 

Andorra
Andorra
 Andorra
Butterflies